Taking Pictures  is the second collection of short stories by Irish writer Anne Enright. It was first published in 2008.

2008 short story collections
Irish short story collections
Jonathan Cape books
Works by Anne Enright